1978 in professional wrestling describes the year's events in the world of professional wrestling.

List of notable promotions 
These promotions held notable shows in 1978.

Calendar of notable shows

Notable Events
February 20 - Bob Backlund pinned Superstar Billy Graham at New York's Madison Square Garden to become the new World Wide Wrestling Federation Heavyweight Champion.
November 21 - Tony Garea and Larry Zbyszko beat the Yukon Lumberjacks to become the new World Wide Wrestling Federation Tag Team Champions.

Awards and honors

Pro Wrestling Illustrated

Championship changes

EMLL

NWA

Births

 January 10 – Tamina
 January 20 - Joy Giovanni 
 January 25 - B. J. Whitmer 
 January 28 – Sheamus
 February 2 - Abraham Washington 
 February 17 - Shiori Asahi 
 March 1 - D. J. Hyde 
 March 6 - Chad Wicks 
 March 14 - Kaori Nakayama
 March 30 – Crazy Boy
 April 7 - Mana the Polynesian Warrior 
 April 13 – SeXXXy Eddy 
 April 16 – Austin Aries
 April 22 – Ezekiel Jackson
 May 15 - Keith Walker 
 May 16 - Justice Pain (died in 2020)
 May 18 - Toru Yano
 May 22 - Daniel Rodimer
 May 24 – Elijah Burke
 June 2 – Joe Líder
 June 6 – ODB
 June 8 – Maria Menounos
 June 19 - Tyson Dux 
 June 20 - Quinton Jackson
 June 24 – Adam Pearce
 July 17:
Akira Raijin 
 Mike Knox
 July 21 - Beer City Bruiser 
 August 15 - Ruckus 
 August 21 - Ricky Reyes 
 August 27 - Kafu 
 August 28 – Linda Miles
 September 8 - Rebel
 November 21 - Choun Shiryu 
 September 24 – Christopher Nowinski
 September 30 – Candice Michelle
 October 15 – Takeshi Morishima
October 18  - Jaime Koeppe  
 October 26 – CM Punk
 November 1 - Tyler Reks 
 November 6 - Johnny Kashmere 
 November 12 - Lena Yada 
 November 21 - Mini Abismo Negro 
 November 28 - Brent Albright
 December 10 - Essa Rios 
 December 13 - Antonio Thomas 
 December 20 - Armando Estrada 
 December 23 – Nanae Takahashi

Debuts
 August 21 - Devil Masami
 Chicky Starr
Kamala (wrestler) 
Koko B. Ware
Jim Neidhart
Buzz Sawyer

Retirements
 Arnold Skaaland (1946 - 1978)

Deaths
 March 27 - John Pesek, 84
 June 30 – Michel Martel, 33
 August 13 – Lonnie Mayne, 33
 November 15 - Willie Gilzenberg, 77
 November 16 – Eric the Red, 44

References

 
professional wrestling